Seven Deadly Sins is an Australian television anthology series examining the dark side of human nature in seven episodes: "Lust", "Pride", "Wrath", "Sloth", "Greed", "Envy", and "Gluttony"—the seven deadly sins.

Production
Seven Deadly Sins was pitched to Penny Chapman, then head of drama at the Australian Broadcasting Corporation, by script editor Barbara Masel. Her idea was to create a series of stories that would "let the moral compass spin". Masel was also interested in encouraging the audience to identify with behaviour they would not normally condone and "that all of the characters in each of the episodes should manifest the sin". With Chapman on board and Bob Weis appointed as series producer, Masel then set about finding writers. When outlines and drafts were completed, the directors were brought on board. P. J. Hogan ("Sloth") and Alison Maclean ("Greed") were selected as directors before their international careers had taken off, while Gale Edwards ("Pride") had until then had only ever directed for the theatre. The series was broadcast at 9.30pm because of the language used. The series rated well, pulling the biggest audience ever at the time for an ABC drama program in that time slot.

Soundtrack

A soundtrack was released by ABC Music and produced by Martin Armiger. It features vocals from multi-platinum/ARIA Award winning artists Paul Kelly, Renée Geyer, Vika Bull and Deborah Conway. The album peaked at number 71 on the ARIA Charts.

Geyer's version of "Crazy" was released as the lead single. "He Can't Decide" was released as the second and final single in 1993.

Track listing

Charts

References

External links

1993 Australian television series debuts
1993 Australian television series endings
Australian Broadcasting Corporation original programming
English-language television shows
Television shows set in Australia
Australian anthology television series
Seven deadly sins in popular culture